The Battle of Atlixco was fought on May 4, 1862 between the French invasion force and their Mexican imperial allies on one side and the Mexican republican forces on the other. The republicans were commanded by Tomas O'Horan, who later defected and was executed at the end of the war. The imperials were commanded by Leonardo Marquez, a veteran of the Mexican–American War and supporter of Miguel Miramón known as the "Tiger of Tacubaya". The two sides were evenly matched with 1,000 soldiers each. The republicans were victorious.

Conflicts in 1862
1862 in Mexico
Battles involving France
Battles of the Second French intervention in Mexico
May 1862 events